Knack or The Knack may refer to:

Music and entertainment
 The Knack, an American pop-rock band famous for their hit "My Sharona"
 The Knack (1960s US band), an American garage rock band active in the 1960s
 The Knack (UK band), a British freakbeat and psychedelic rock band
 "The Knack" (Dilbert episode), an episode of the TV series Dilbert
 The Knack ...and How to Get It, a 1965 British film
 Knack Productions, a Japanese animation studio that created the series  The Adventures of the Little Prince and others

Games
 Knack (card game), Swedish gambling card game
 Knack (video game), a launch title developed by SCE Japan Studio for the Sony PlayStation 4

Other
 Knäck, Swedish Christmas Butterscotch
 Knack (magazine), a Belgian news magazine

See also

 4312 Knacke, a main-belt asteroid
 Knäcke or crispbread
 Knacker, a person in the trade of rendering animals, and slang derived from the term
 Knacker (band), a Canadian indie rock band
 
 Knick Knack (disambiguation)
 Knick (disambiguation)
 NAC (disambiguation)
 Nach (disambiguation)
 Nack (disambiguation)
 Nak (disambiguation)
 Nakh (disambiguation)
 Naq (disambiguation)